

Alexander Holle (27 February 1898 – 16 July 1978) was a German general (Generalleutnant) in the Luftwaffe's Condor Legion during the German involvement in the Spanish Civil War and World War II. He was a recipient of the Knight's Cross of the Iron Cross of Nazi Germany.

From 8 May 1945 to February 1948 Holle was a prisoner of war. After his release he married on 12 May 1948 and had a daughter.

On 16 July 1978 he died in Munich and was buried with a military honor guard.

Awards and decorations

 German Cross in Gold on 11 May 1942 as Oberst with Kampfgeschwader 26
 Knight's Cross of the Iron Cross on 30 December 1942 as Oberst and as Fliegerführer Nord and Geschwaderkommodore of Kampfgeschwader 26.

References

Citations

Bibliography

 
 

1898 births
1978 deaths
Military personnel from Bielefeld
People from the Province of Westphalia
German Army personnel of World War I
Luftwaffe World War II generals
Recipients of the clasp to the Iron Cross, 1st class
Recipients of the Gold German Cross
Recipients of the Knight's Cross of the Iron Cross
Recipients of the Order of the Cross of Liberty, 1st Class
German prisoners of war in World War II
Reichswehr personnel
Shot-down aviators
Condor Legion personnel
Prussian Army personnel
Lieutenant generals of the Luftwaffe